= 1991 Norfolk Island electoral status referendum =

21 October 1991
- The Commonwealth proposes to pass a law to make Norfolk Island a part of Canberra for federal electoral purposes. Are you in favor of this proposal?

Results
Choice	Votes	%
Yes	178	18.18%
No	801	81.82%
Valid votes	979	99.29%
Invalid or blank votes	7	0.71%
Total votes	986	100.00%

An electoral status referendum was held in Norfolk Island on 21 October 1991 on whether Norfolk Island would become part of Canberra for electoral purposes.

Voters were asked: "The Commonwealth proposes to pass a law to make Norfolk Island a part of Canberra for federal electoral purposes. Are you in favor of this proposal?". The referendum was defeated in a landslide, with more than 80% of voters against the proposal.
